The World Union of Deists (WUD) is the largest and oldest organization in the world promoting the natural religion of Deism.

History
The World Union of Deists was founded in Charlottesville, Virginia on April 10, 1993, by Robert Johnson.  The WUD is based in the United States with representatives in some thirty countries, produces podcasts, manages an online library, and publishes the journal Deism. The motto is "God Gave Us Reason, Not Religion". The WUD has a bi-monthly publication called Think!

International Members

Europe
 Unione Deista Italiana
  Association Déiste de France

America
 Deismo Brasil
 Deísmo Colombia

Africa
 Deism in Egypt - الربوبية في مصر
 Deism Uganda
 Deism Tanzania
 Deism Nigeria

Asia
 Deism India
 Deism in Jordan - الربوبية في الأردن
 Deism in Iraq - الربوبية في العراق 
 Scientific Humanistic Deism

References

 
 
Theism
Monotheism
Philosophy of religion